The two German Class 04 steam locomotives were experimental engines with the Deutsche Reichsbahn, that were derived from the Class 03 standard locomotives (Einheitsloks).

History 
These engines, built by the firm of Krupp, were initially tested at the Grunewald Locomotive Testing Office. With a specific steam consumption value of 5.2 kg/PSh with respect to their indicated output, the locomotives clearly undercut the very low steam consumption value of the Class 03 by over 1 kg/PSh. The coal consumption based on the effective power at the coupling hook, was 0.96 kg/PSh compared with 1.13 kg/PSh on the 03.

The medium-pressure boilers did not prove to be stable, and after a short time damage occurred to the firebox. Since the locomotives did not meet expectations even after modifications and repairs, the permissible boiler overpressure was finally reduced to 20 atmospheres in 1935 and they were added to the operating portfolio with the company numbers 02 101 and 02 102. They were then intended to be used in regular train service from the Hamburg-Altona depot, but since they had no experience with four-cylinder compound locomotives there, they were handed over to the Hof depot in 1936. Due to a lack of water, the boiler of 02 101 exploded on 3 April 1939, whereupon both engines were decommissioned and were scrapped in 1940.

The engines were equipped with a 2'2' T 32 standard tender.

See also
 List of DRG locomotives and railcars
 List of boiler explosions

References 

04
4-6-2 locomotives
04
Krupp locomotives
Railway locomotives introduced in 1932
Standard gauge locomotives of Germany
2′C1′ h4v locomotives
Passenger locomotives